Amblyseius pretoriaensis is a species of mite in the family Phytoseiidae.

References

pretoriaensis
Articles created by Qbugbot
Animals described in 1988